A reliquary (also referred to as a shrine, by the French term châsse, and historically including phylacteries) is a container for relics. A portable reliquary may be called a fereter, and a chapel in which it is housed a feretory.

Relics may be the purported or actual physical remains of saints, such as bones, pieces of clothing, or some object associated with saints or other religious figures. The authenticity of any given relic is often a matter of debate; for that reason, some churches require documentation of the relic's provenance.

Relics have long been important to Buddhists, Christians, Hindus, and to followers of many other religions. In these cultures, reliquaries are often presented in shrines, churches, or temples to which the faithful make pilgrimages to gain blessings.

The term is sometimes used loosely for containers for the body parts of non-religious figures; in particular, the Kings of France often specified that their hearts and sometimes other organs be buried in a different location from their main burial.

In Christianity

The use of reliquaries became an important part of Christian practices from at least the 4th century, initially in the Eastern Churches, which adopted the practice of moving and dividing the bodies of saints much earlier than the West, probably in part because the new capital of Constantinople, unlike Rome, lacked buried saints. Relics are venerated in the Oriental Orthodox, Eastern Orthodox, Roman Catholic and some Anglican Churches.  Reliquaries provide a means of protecting and displaying relics. While frequently taking the form of caskets, they range in size from simple pendants or rings to very elaborate ossuaries.

The relics were enshrined in containers crafted of or covered with gold, silver, gems, and enamel. Ivory was widely used in the Middle Ages for reliquaries; its pure white color is an indication of the holy status of its contents. These objects constituted a major form of artistic production across Europe and Byzantium throughout the Middle Ages.

Many were designed with portability in mind, often being exhibited in public or carried in procession on the saint's feast day or on other holy days. Pilgrimages often centered on the veneration of relics. The faithful often venerate relics by bowing before the reliquary or kissing it; those churches which observe the veneration of relics distinguish between the honor given to the saints and the worship that is due to God alone (see Second Council of Nicea).

Sixteenth-century reformers such as Martin Luther opposed the use of relics since many had no proof of historical authenticity and objected to a cult of saints. Many reliquaries, particularly in northern Europe, were destroyed by Calvinists or Calvinist sympathizers during the Reformation, being melted down or pulled apart to recover precious metals and gems. Nonetheless, the use and manufacture of reliquaries continue to this day, especially in Roman Catholic and Orthodox Christian countries. Post-Reformation reliquaries have tended to take the form of glass-sided caskets to display relics such as the bodies of saints.

Forms

The earliest reliquaries were essentially boxes, either simply box-shaped or based on an architectural design, taking the form of a model of a church with a pitched roof. These latter are known by the French term chasse, and typical examples from the 12th to 14th century have wooden frameworks with gilt-copper plaques nailed on, decorated in champlevé enamel. Limoges was the largest production centre; NB the English usage differs from that of the French châsse, which denotes large size rather than shape.

Relics of the True Cross became very popular from the 9th century onward and were housed in magnificent gold and silver cross-shaped reliquaries decorated with enamels and precious stones. From about the end of the 10th century, reliquaries in the shape of the relics they housed also became popular; hence, for instance, the skull of Pope Alexander I was housed in a head-shaped reliquary. Similarly, the bones of saints were often housed in reliquaries that recalled the shape of the original body part, such as an arm or a foot.

Many Eastern Orthodox reliquaries housing tiny pieces of relics have circular or cylindrical slots in which small disks of wax-mastic are placed, in which the actual relic is embedded.

A philatory is a transparent reliquary designed to contain and exhibit the bones and relics of saints. This style of reliquary has a viewing portal to view the relic inside. The feretrum was a medieval form of reliquary or shrine containing the sacred effigies and relics of a saint.

During the later Middle Ages, the monstrance form, primarily used for consecrated hosts, was sometimes used for reliquaries. These housed the relic in a rock crystal, or glass capsule mounted on a column above a base, enabling the relic to be displayed to the faithful. Reliquaries in the form of large pieces of metalwork jewellery also appeared around this time, housing tiny relics such as pieces of the Holy Thorn, notably the Holy Thorn Reliquary now in the British Museum.

In Buddhism

In Buddhism, stupas are an important form of a reliquary and may be buried inside larger structures such as a stupa or chorten. Particularly in China and throughout East and Southeast Asia, these take the form of a pagoda; in Japan, this is known as a tō.

Two famous very early excavated reliquaries are the 1st-century Bimaran Casket and the Kanishka Casket of 127 AD, both believed to have contained part of the cremated remains of Gautama Buddha. Relics associated with Buddha are the most important in Buddhism, but those related to other enlightened figures like Sariputta and Moggallana are also highly revered. 

In Buddhism, relics are known as cetiya; one of the most significant is the relic of the tooth of the Buddha in Sri Lanka. (See also: Japanese Buddhist architecture)

See also 
 Cetiya
 Relics of Sariputta and Moggallana
 Shrine of the Three Kings in Cologne Cathedral

References

Further reading
 
 
 Weitzmann, Kurt, ed., Age of spirituality: late antique and early Christian art, third to seventh century, no. 569–575, 1979, Metropolitan Museum of Art, New York,

External links 
 

 
Chests (furniture)
Religious objects